Rudy Gauwe (born 14 June 1951) is a Belgian former professional boxer. As an amateur, he competed in the men's heavyweight event at the 1976 Summer Olympics, where he was defeated by Clarence Hill of Bermuda in the quarterfinals..

Professional boxing record

References

External links
 

1951 births
Living people
Belgian male boxers
Olympic boxers of Belgium
Boxers at the 1976 Summer Olympics
People from Lokeren
Heavyweight boxers
Sportspeople from East Flanders